The Santa Isabel College, also referred to by its acronym SIC, is a private, Roman Catholic college owned and operated by the  Sisters of Charity of Saint Vincent De Paul in Ermita, Manila, Philippines. It was founded on 24 October 1632. Santa Isabel College is one of the oldest colleges in the Philippines and in Asia.

History
The Colegio de Santa Isabel was founded on October 24, 1632, with the primary purpose of educating Spanish orphans in this most distant Spanish colony, and is one of the oldest girl schools in the world.  In later years its doors were opened to Spanish Filipina girls as well. In 1733, by a royal decree the name of the college was changed to “Real Colegio de Santa Isabel.  The records of its establishment can be found at the Archive of the Indies in Seville, Spain.

On July 22, 1862, fifteen Daughters of Charity of St. Vincent de Paul arrived in the Philippines from Spain. Two years after, the Daughters of Charity took over the administration of the Real Colegio de Santa Isabel.  The College was then in Intramuros until World War 2 when it was totally destroyed by shelling and fire in the liberation of Manila.  After losing the Colegio, the Sisters sought refuge at St. Rita's College which was fortunately spared from the ravages of war.

The Sisters taught in St. Rita's College to support themselves, determined to keep alive the name of this illustrious college.  The zealous Sisters left no stone unturned until they found a temporary home for its students.  It was through the kindness of the benevolent and compassionate Monsignor Vicente Reyes, then Parish Priest of San Miguel Parish, who offered some rooms in the convent so that the Sisters were able to renew their apostolate of educating the young.  The sisters, led by Sr. Juana Zabalza, Superior of the College at that time, and the indefatigable principal Sr. Candida Ocampo, who later became the first Filipina Superior of the College, were able to acquire the former St. Rita at 210 Taft Avenue, Manila.

Some time after the war, the name was changed to Santa Isabel College.

Since 1968, four buildings were added to Santa Isabel.  The school auditorium, built in 1953, was modernized.  The Sister Catalina Ledesma Mini Recital Hall was constructed from the funds provided by the Sister Catalina Scholarship Foundation.

In 1982, Santa Isabel College celebrated its 350th Foundation Anniversary. After three and a half centuries, Santa Isabel College has expanded its educational programs.

The courses, Bachelor of Science in Business Administration, Bachelor of Science in Accountancy, Bachelor of Arts, Bachelor of Elementary/Secondary Education, and Music are still being offered, but the curricula were updated and enriched according to the demands of the times.  Teacher Certificate Program (TCP) for Professionals was opened.  The Music Program, likewise, has expanded and now gives short term courses.

The Bachelor of Science in Public Relations was given government recognition in 1981.  Santa Isabel College then is the only school in the Philippines offering Bachelor of Science in Public Relations.  Aside from the said offerings, the school's four courses were given recognition by the government. They are:  Bachelor of Science in Information Technology, Bachelor of   Science in Information Management, Bachelor of Science in Office Administration, and Bachelor of Arts in Human Development. With the opening of the courses, Santa Isabel College opened its portals to male students, which was not actually new because the Music Program has always been accepting male students since it opened after the World War II.

Santa Isabel College continuously re-invented itself to address the challenges of the times. Intensive curriculum revision, realigning and mapping for more cohesive and relevant offerings were undertaken in order to answer current needs.  Thus, new programs were conceived: two-year Associate in Computer Technology, two-year Certificate in Hotel and Restaurant Management, and two-year Certificate in Accountancy.  The school year 2005-2006 ushered in new programs: Bachelor of Science in Hotel and Restaurant Management and evening classes for working students.

In 2004, the Bachelor of Science in Hotel and Restaurant Management was offered.  To comply with the practicum requirements of the course, the Chateau Santa Isabel Practicum Center was built. The practicum center serves as the in-house training ground of the Hotel and Restaurant Management students. It was inaugurated on March 15, 2005, and was opened to the public on May 1, 2005.  Still part of the reinvention, the internet café was inaugurated and became operational for use of the students and personnel.  Eventually, the internet café became part of the facilities of Chateau Santa Isabel Practicum Center which was opened on May 1, 2005.

The school year 2005-2006 ushered in new programs: Evening classes with course offerings such as: Associate in Computer Technology, Certificate in Hotel and Restaurant Management, and Certificate in Accountancy which are ladderized courses and Bachelor of Science in Business Administration major in Marketing Management.
The Alternative Learning System (ALS) was introduced by the Office of the Community of Extension Services.

The Music Department, this year, celebrated its Diamond Jubilee (75 years).  The Opening concert was held at the Philamlife Theater and the Closing Concert at the Cultural Center of the Philippines.

On October 24, 2007, Santa Isabel College marked its 375th Foundation Anniversary. The celebration was highlighted by a stage play entitled “Vincent and Louise in the city”. It was performed by selected students and faculty at the Sto. Cristo del Tesoro Auditorium. A High Mass was also presided over by Archbishop Gaudencio B. Cardinal Rosales at the Manila Cathedral.

Just after the Vietnam War, Santa Isabel College opened the Center for Assistance to Displaced Persons. The refugees and boat people from Vietnam, Laos and Cambodia were assisted by the Center under the Sisters and Staff. The Louise de Marillac Foundation, Inc. caters to the needs of an adopted community in Paliparan, Dasmariñas, Cavite and in Barangay 736, Zone 80, Quirino Avenue, Manila.

Santa Isabel College has an  alumni association which meets every month.  They hold fund-generatingprojects to help improve the school plant, give scholarships and help those who are materially deprived. Every year those Manila-based alumni join their fellow alumni in the United States and Canada in a grand reunion.

The Basic Education Department has organized a Parent's Council for the whole department. Officers and members are parents and guardians of students from all programs.  Parents are organized as partners of the school in educating the young.

The curriculum was revised to meet later needs.  New programs were conceived: two-year Associate in Computer Technology, two Year Certificate in Hotel and Restaurant Management, two-year Certificate in Accountancy, and short term computer courses. The school year 2005-2006 ushered  in new programs: Bachelor of Science in Hotel and Restaurant Management and  evening classes for working students.

After the PAASCU visit last February 27–28, 2000, the school was granted reaccreditation for a period of five years, effective April 2002 – 2007.

The Higher Education Department passed the Level 2 PAASCU Accreditation on January 25, 2005, during the Interim Visit. The visit was conducted for Liberal Arts, Education and Business Administration programs.

In the school year 2003-2004 the school community underwent sessions on the revision of the institution's vision-mission statement, an integration of the vision-mission statements of the MAPSA (Manila Archdiocesan and Parochial Schools Association) and the SLMES (St. Louise de Marillac Educational System), as well as scenario building and strategic planning.  All of these are aimed for continuous growth and improvement, harnessing the capacity for continual transformation.

Santa Isabel College has operated for more than three centuries.

 April 6, 1594 – Institution founded as a Charitable Brotherhood
 October 24, 1632 – Institution becomes the Colegio de Santa Isabel beginning its educational history
 May 25, 1636 – Rules and regulations governing the college were drafted
 March 25, 1733 – Philip V of Spain orders the college be called "Real Colegio de Santa Isabel" (Royal College of Saint Isabel)
 1852 - Isabella II of Spain orders the Daughters of Charity to the Philippines
 July 22, 1862 – Daughters of Charity arrive in the Philippines
 1866 - Real Colegio de Santa Isabel merges with Colegio de Santa Pontencian
 August 13, 1933 – A fire destroys almost half of the college
 February 7, 1945 – A fire destroys the college during the Battle for the Liberation of Manila
 September 14, 1947 – A marker is unveiled commemorating the new, English name of the college

Academic programs offered
Pre-school (Nursery and Kindergarten)
Elementary (Grade 1 to Grade 6)
High School (Grade 7 to Grade 12)
Bachelor of Music with majors in Music Education, Composition, Piano and Voice
Bachelor of Arts in English
Bachelor of Elementary Education
Bachelor of Secondary Education with majors in Religious Education, English and Computer Education
Bachelor of Science in Accountancy
Bachelor of Science in Business Administration with majors in Human Resource Management, Marketing Management and Financial Management
Bachelor of Science in Information Technology
Bachelor of Science in Hotel and Restaurant Management
Master of Music
Master of Arts in Music
TESDA Short Courses

College seal

The Cross at the center of Santa Isabel College's seal symbolizes Christ, the Center, whose charity urges the institution in its mission of educating the youth. The even arms of the cross stand for the school's freedom from bias in the choice of her students. In between the arms are inscribed four Latin terms, namely: Caritas-Charity, Humilitas-Humility, Sapientia-Knowledge, and Disciplina-Discipline. The school instills in the young, benevolent love, humility, and self-control in relation to themselves, their peers, and specially the less-privileged. The students are given equal opportunities to acquire and interpret knowledge of truth about the realities around and most especially, the reality of God's providence to human beings, through the different programs. These four aspects of the seal are integrated in the context of the student's Christian and human development.

The colors in the seal are maroon and gold. The cross is colored gold, and the letters and lines are maroon. Gold symbolizes the Church dedicated to the cause of Christian Education. Maroon is the symbol of royalty.  Santa Isabel College was founded out of the Spanish Queen's unselfish devotion to the welfare of others. She provided free education to the orphaned daughters of the Spanish soldiers and later to deserving Filipino young girls.

College Patron and Patron Saints

Saint Vincent de Paul

September 27
Founder of the Daughters of Charity and the Congregation of the Mission

It was in the 16th century when France was terribly ravaged by political and religious wars when Vincent de Paul, who later became an ardent Apostle of Charity, was born. That was on April 24, 1581, in a remote village of Pouy, Landes at the southernmost part of France near the border of Spain. At an early age, he exhibited the qualities of kindness, generosity and great compassion for the poor. He was not only a bright but also a pious boy. He was only fifteen when he went to college, sixteen when he received the tonsure and at 20, he was ordained priest. That was on September 23, 1600. He offered his first mass in a small chapel in Buzet where he often prayed as a child. At 40, he was a wholly man of God; ready to give himself to the point of heroism in relieving the spiritual and material needs of the poor he saw everywhere. “ I belong,” he said “ to God and to the poor”.

Vincent suffered countless tribulations; he was sold in a slave market and accused as thief. The piety he practiced was simple, nourished on the words and example of Christ, and oriented towards action. He had excelled in practical judgment, but his gift, inspiring and working with others was, in a special way, the fruit of humility. He once said, “I have tried over and over again to find out the best means of living in union with God and in Charity with my neighbors, and I have never found anything that helped as much as humility- the lowering of oneself below everyone else, with the sense that is really worse than others, and the refusal to judge anyone”. He made it a practice that, whenever two ways of saying something came to his mind, he chose the less brilliant.

In one of the many dialogue-conferences preserved in priceless notes by the Sisters, he said, “God has given me such a high esteem for simplicity that I call it my Gospel”. He was always himself, whether with galley slaves or in the Council of Conscience, the selecting bishops for France. He was a great influence in the spiritual formation of St. Louise de Marillac who received from St. Francis de Sales the care of the Visitation nuns in Paris.

In 1625, he founded the Congregation of the Mission, also called Vincentians or Lazarists, to preach and educate priests. In 1633, he founded the “little company” of the Daughters of Charity which numbered around 54,000 all over the world. More than 600 are in the Philippines today.

ST. LOUISE DE MARILLAC

MARCH 15
St. Vincent's co-founder of The Daughters of Charity

St. Louise de Marillac, co-founder of St. Vincent de Paul of the Daughters of Charity, is declared Patroness of those who do social work. She was born on August 12, 1591. She married a relatively rich man who left her a widow with a young son while she was very young.

She became increasingly under the influence of St. Vincent who discovered, along with her scruples and complexes, great generosity and burning desire to love God and be of help to others. He put her in-charge of the young women he was organizing to care for the poor sick in their homes. Under him, she trained the first recruits in the Parish home and drew up the original rules for the Company of the Daughters of Charity. She reinforced St. Vincent's desire to keep the Sisters out of the standard requirement of enclosure. She strongly supported St. Vincent's exhortation to the sisters: “Your convent will be the house of the sick; your cloister, the streets of the city and wards of the hospital; your enclosure, obedience, your grille, the fear of God; your veil, holy modesty”.

St. Louise died on March 15, 1660. On her deathbed, St. Louise pleaded with her sisters, Be diligent in serving the poor. Love the poor, honor them my children, as you would honor Christ himself”.ST. ELIZABETH OF HUNGARY''

November 17

Elizabeth was the daughter of the King of Hungary. She married Louis IV, Duke of Thuringia, at the age of 14. She was a mother with three children.

Her life is an example of devotion to her husband and to the poor. She set up three hospitals, and spent the best years of her life in piety and services to the poor and the sick. She became a widow at the age of 24 and thereupon entered the Third Order of Saint Francis where she practiced heroic works of charity. She spent the remaining years of her life administering to the poor, the destitute and the sick.

Amidst great deprivations and even rejection by her own household, she continued her works of charity, mercy, and kindness. She died on November 17, 1231, and was canonized four years after her death.

There are two well-known miracles during the lifetime of St. Elizabeth. One is the Miracle of Roses. Elizabeth was coming from the royal kitchen with bread for the poor which she bid under her apron when she met Louis who asked her what she was hiding. She said, “Roses my Lord”. When Louis gestured to see, she let go her apron and down fell, fresh red roses. And there are no roses on winter.

There was a story about a leper whom St. Elizabeth brought to the Master's Bedroom, to keep him warm and comfortable. When the royal household learned about it, there was a commotion. Louis could not believe Elizabeth could do such thing, so he led the members of the household to see for themselves… to prove that there was no leper. There was a wounded Christ in the room.

St. Elizabeth of Hungary is the patroness of Santa Isabel College and our school is named after her.

ST. CATHERINE LABOURE

November 28
“The Saint of Silence”

On July 27, 1947, Pius XII among the number of Saints, St. Catherine Laboure whom she was pleased to name: THE SAINT OF SILENCE.

Zoe Laboure was born on May 2, 1806, in the town of Fainles-Moutiers, of peasant parents who nurtured their children with love and mutual help and allowed God to reign in the family. Her mother died when Zoe was nine, but this loss led her to take refuge in the boundless love of Mary.

Even in her younger years, Zoe manifested a great love for prayer and penance and at the age of nineteen, she strongly felt the call of God through a strange dream picturing an old priest beckoning her to offer herself to God through the person of the sick poor. This old priest in her dream became very important to her in her life because she discovered later that he was St. Vincent de Paul, the founder of the Daughters of Charity, where she was admitted as a postulant on April 21, 1830, and was consequently named Sister Catherine.

As a seminary Sister (novice in other congregations), she was a model of humility, simplicity, charity, renunciation and holy obedience. A special and ordinary favor dawned upon her life on that wonderful night of July 19, 1830, when the Blessed Mother appeared to her, seated in the Director's chair in the chapel of the Daughters of Charity Motherhouse in Rue de Bac, Paris. Sister Catherine kneeling with her hands resting on the Blessed Mother's knees listened carefully and prayerfully during the intimate conversation on the mission entrusted to her by our Lady. “Come to the foot of this altar, there graces will be poured on all those who ask for them with confidence and fervor. They will be poured out on the great and the humble…” the Lady assured her.

On the third apparition on November 27, Sister Catherine was commissioned to have a medal struck after the models shown to her. “Those who wear it will receive great graces; abundant graces will be given to those who have confidence” our Lady told her. This is the Miraculous Medal.

Sister Catherine recounted the apparition only to Father Aladel, the Director of the Daughters of Charity, who after much insistence from her brought the matter to Monsignor de Quelen, Archbishop of Paris. The latter found nothing that was conformable to faith and authorized the medal to be struck. In May 1832, the first medal was distributed and soon there were talks of many cures and conversions.

There was no religious life that would be more ordinary and simpler than St. Catherine's in spite of the special privilege that she experienced. She was given her duties in the Hospice for old men in Enghien while at the same time she took charge of the poultry yard. All these she accomplished with charity, humility, and simplicity rooted in her union with God and the Blessed Mother. In all the forty-five years of her life in the Hospice, nobody knew that she was the Sister to whom the Blessed Mother appeared.

Then it was 1876. the moment to speak has come; the Blessed Virgin released her from her silence and before her last breath on December 31, 1876, Sister Catherine confided the story to the Superior of the house of Reifully, Sister Dufes.

Fifty-six years later, Cardinal Verdier authorized the exhumation with a view of her beatification. This took place in the presence of two doctors, the Superior General and other witnesses. Just as she had been laid to rest years ago, her limbs were supple; the pupils of her eyes are blue. Now her body is placed in a glass reliquary in the Chapel of the Motherhouse of the Daughters of Charity in Rue de Bac, at the altar of the Blessed Mother in the very place where more than a century earlier, Mary had appeared to her.

History of the Santo Cristo del Tesoro de Manila

The venerable image of Sto. Cristo del Tesoro is enshrined in the main Altar of the Santa Isabel College Chapel

How it came to its present shrine involves a loving story beginning as far back as 1631. This year marked the arrival of the image in the Philippines from Acapulco for the Santa Mesa de la Misericordia. It was a gift of Don Juan Lopez, a captain who gave up the career of the sword, for that of charity. He was then bookkeeper of the above-mentioned charitable institution. The crucifix was placed in a shrine near the treasury of the Santa Mesa de la Misericordia as a guardian keeping a vigilant eye on the treasures of his beloved children. In fact, the crucified Christ proved that the treasury remained inexhaustible in spite of the many poor whose cries for alms and mercy were unfailingly answered. Day in and out, the number of grateful devotees to the image increased. The Walled City of Manila counted the Santo Cristo del Tesoro among the images of popular devotion.

What began as the poor's material treasure became an infinite treasury of divine grace, open to all who seek the Lord's mercy in their needs. Even in the mission fields of China and Japan, the missionaries have attributed the conversion of the pagans to Santo Cristo del Tesoro. In times of drought, the Archbishop of Manila with his parishioners joined in a solemn procession in honor of this image, imploring for rain, and the events that followed did not fall short of the trust he and the people of Manila had placed in the Black Christ.

During the Japanese occupation, devotion to Santo Cristo del Tesoro found its way into the dreaded Fort Santiago and other places of torture. Freed or liberated prisoners form the fort went to the chapel of Santa Isabel College in Intramuros to bend their faltering knees before His image in fervent and humble thanksgiving.

Much of Santo Cristo del Tesoro is written in the secret pages of the human heart and much is kept in the unfathomable depths of many human souls that has gone along the road to Calvary under the protective wing of the Holy Cross of Christ. In the Book of Life, we will find sometimes the complete history of three hundred and sixty years that has formed a part of an epoch of grace that will end in eternity. Every year, we see glimmer of the exuberant life of grace in the hundreds of eyes that are lovingly raised to Santo Cristo del Tesoro, for on the Feast of the Exaltation of the Holy Cross (September 14), people from all walks of life flock to the chapel of Santa Isabel College to pay homage to the only true treasure they possess in their life.

External links

History of Santa Isabel College (official website)

Catholic universities and colleges in Manila
Catholic elementary schools in Manila
Catholic secondary schools in Manila
Education in Ermita
1594 establishments in the Philippines
Universities and colleges in Manila